The Story of Us is a 2016 Philippine romantic melodrama television series a production of Star Creatives directed by Richard Somes, starring Kim Chiu and Xian Lim, together with an ensemble cast. The series premiered on ABS-CBN and worldwide on The Filipino Channel on February 29, 2016, replacing On the Wings of Love. 

The show ended on June 17, 2016, concluding the first and second season with 77 episodes.

Series overview

Episodes

Book 1

Book 2: The Finale

References

Lists of Philippine drama television series episodes